Xylota flavitarsis is a species of hoverfly in the family Syrphidae.

Distribution
Australia.

References

Eristalinae
Insects described in 1985
Diptera of Australasia
Taxa named by Pierre-Justin-Marie Macquart